Celeron Island is an island in the Detroit River. It is in Wayne County, in southeast Michigan, and the southernmost island within Grosse Ile Township.

Due to erosion, it now comprises two separate islands.  Celeron Island is uninhabited and administered by the Michigan Department of Natural Resources, as the island was included into Pointe Mouillee State Game Area in 1976.  Celeron Island is undergoing a restoration project with funding from the National Oceanic and Atmospheric Administration.
  

Celeron Island was named for Pierre Joseph Céloron de Blainville.

References

Islands of Wayne County, Michigan
Islands of the Detroit River
River islands of Michigan